John Michael Hayden (born April 27, 1984 in Louisville, Kentucky) is a former American soccer player and current head coach of the men's team of the University of Louisville.

Playing career

Youth and college
Hayden attended Trinity High School in Louisville, where he played on the school soccer team.  He was a two-time Parade Magazine All-American and was the 2000–01 Kentucky Gatorade Player of the Year.

Hayden played college soccer at Indiana University. After redshirting his freshman season, Hayden began to see regular time with the Hoosiers in 2003.  He helped Indiana win back-to-back NCAA titles in 2003 and 2004 as well as Big Ten Conference Tournament titles in 2003 and 2006.  Hayden was named second team All-Big Ten in 2004 and first team All-Big Ten in 2006.  He also made the NCAA College Cup All-Tournament Team during 2004.

While at Indiana, Hayden spent the collegiate off-season with several teams in the USL Premier Development League (PDL; now known as USL League Two).  In 2002, he played with the West Michigan Edge.  In 2004, he spent the season with the Indiana Blast and in 2005 with the Chicago Fire Premier. Hayden signed with the Fort Wayne Fever for the 2006 season.

Professional 
On January 12, 2007, the Houston Dynamo selected Hayden in the first round (13th overall) in the 2007 MLS SuperDraft. He made his professional debut on July 10 in a 1–0 loss to the Charleston Battery in a U.S. Open Cup match. The Dynamo would go on to win MLS Cup 2007, but Hayden did not appear in the MLS regular season or playoffs.

During the 2008 season, Hayden made 2 total appearances for the Dynamo, once in the Open Cup and once in the CONCACAF Champions League.

He was loaned out to USL-1 side Cleveland City Stars in May 2009. While at Cleveland he landed USL-1 team of the week accolades following performances against the Portland Timbers and the Minnesota Thunder.

On July 1, 2009, Hayden made his first appearance of the 2009 season for Houston against the Austin Aztex in a 2–0 in the Open Cup. Hayden played in subsequent cup games for the Dynamo against the Charleston Battery, a 4–0 win in which Hayden recorded 2 assists, and the Seattle Sounders, a 2–1 loss.  He also made 3 appearances in the Champions League group stage.  He once again did not appear in a MLS match.

ON November 25, 2009, Hayden was waived by Houston.

In January 2010, Hayden signed with his hometown's Louisville Lightning of the Professional Arena Soccer League. He also returned to the Lightning for the full 2010–11 season.

Coaching career 
During his playing career, Hayden served as director for Mockingbird Valley SC and Chicago Fire Juniors: Kentucky. In 2012, Hayden was hired as the assistant  coach for the University of Louisville men's soccer program.  During the 2012 season, the Cardinals won the Big East Conference regular season title and advanced to the NCAA Tournament Elite Eight.

Hayden left Louisville to become an assistant at Lipscomb University in 2013. While at Lipscomb Hayden helped the Bisons to an Atlantic Sun Conference regular season title in 2014. The Bison were 21-13-4 overall during his two years in Nashville.

On April 10, 2015, Hayden was hired by Xavier University as their associate head coach for the Musketeers men's soccer program. During his one season with Xavier, the Musketeers had a 12-6-1 record.

In 2016 Hayden returned to the University of Louisville as an assistant coach.  During his 3 seasons as the assistant, Louisville reached 3 NCAA Tournaments and the 2018 ACC Men's Soccer Tournament.

On December 27, 2018, Louisville hired Hayden as the head coach for the men's soccer program, the 5th in program history.

Head coaching record

Career statistics 
Source:

Personal life
Hayden was born and raised in Louisville, Kentucky.  He attended Trinity High School and Indiana University.

On December 1, 2007 Hayden married Hollie Minogue, who played women's soccer at Louisville.  Together they have 2 sons.

Honors
Indiana University
NCAA Men's Division I Soccer Championship: 2004
Big Ten Conference Tournament: 2003, 2006
Big Ten Conference Regular Season: 2002, 2003, 2004, 2006
Houston Dynamo

 MLS Cup: 2007

References

External links
MLS player profile

1984 births
Living people
American soccer players
Association football midfielders
Indiana Hoosiers men's soccer players
West Michigan Edge players
Cleveland City Stars players
Indiana Blast players
Chicago Fire U-23 players
Fort Wayne Fever players
Houston Dynamo FC players
Soccer players from Louisville, Kentucky
Trinity High School (Louisville) alumni
USL League Two players
USL First Division players
Houston Dynamo FC draft picks
Louisville Cardinals men's soccer coaches
American soccer coaches
Professional Arena Soccer League players